The 1991 ICF Canoe Sprint World Championships were held in Paris, France.

The men's competition consisted of eight Canadian (single paddle, open boat) and nine kayak events. Five events were held for the women, all in kayak. This was the first championship with a unified German team for the first time since 1938 following separate East German and West German teams that competed from 1950 to 1990.

This was the 24th championships in canoe sprint.

Medal summary

Men's

Canoe

Kayak

Women's

Kayak

Medals table

References
ICF medalists for Olympic and World Championships - Part 1: flatwater (now sprint): 1936-2007.
ICF medalists for Olympic and World Championships - Part 2: rest of flatwater (now sprint) and remaining canoeing disciplines: 1936-2007.

Icf Canoe Sprint World Championships, 1991
Icf Canoe Sprint World Championships, 1991
ICF Canoe Sprint World Championships
International sports competitions hosted by France
Canoeing and kayaking competitions in France